Nandaa Dorairaj is an Indian actor, producer who primarily works in Tamil films. He made his debut in Mounam Pesiyadhe (2002) and later appeared in other films such as Eeram (2009).

Early life
Nandaa Dorairaj was born as Govind Durairaj in Coimbatore to Durairaj and Rani. He has a younger brother Karthik and is the grandson of former Union minister M. Kannappan.

Personal life
Nandaa married Vidyaroopa in the Tirumala Temple on 17 July 2013 at Codissia E Hall, Avinashi Road, Coimbatore.

Career

He was spotted by producer S. Thanu during his family function. In 1998, he joined the Film Institute in Chennai and obtained a diploma in acting after a one-year course. He first signed up to star in a project titled Enna Solla Pogirai opposite Gayathri Raguram, but the film was later stalled. He made his debut in 2002 with the movie Mounam Pesiyadhe along with Suriya and Trisha Krishnan by film director Ameer. Director Ameer was looking for a cheerful and well built hero to play the co-role with Suriya. Nandhaa immediately fit the criteria and was therefore selected for the role. Punnagai Poove in 2003, showed him as a full-time hero. In 2005, he acted in Selvam. In a freak mishap, he suffers an injury on his head and he forgets all about his past. Nandha playing a confused youth has given a good and matured performance. Donning a tricky character. In 2006, he appeared in two movies as Kodambakkam and Aanivaer. He play in action film, Agaram (2007). The film was released to positive reviews. Followed by Urchagam (2007).

His movie Eeram (2009) was a hit produced by director S. Shankar. Following the success of Eeram, director Shankar again cast him in his production for the second time in Anandhapurathu Veedu (2010), directed by Naga. Then he starred alongside Jiiva in Vanthaan Vendraan (2011). He starred in Vellore Maavattam (2011), in which he played a cop. After two years without movies, Nandha became an action hero in movies as Athithi (2014), Katham Katham (2015),  Adhibar (2015) and Kallaattam (2016). In 2018 again after Mounam Pesiyadhe, he starred alongside Suriya in Thaana Serndha Kootam directed by Vignesh Shivan for studio green productions, which turned out to be a success. He has also been starred in a web series produced by Ekta Kapoor for Balaji teleflims which was Tamil s first web series directed by Kaushik. The next is Zhagaram (2019) the adventure thriller film. Nandha who plays Akhilan is very fit and passes off as a young man quite convincingly and lends authenticity to the role of the reluctant treasure hunter. In 2020, he acted as dual roles in Vaanam Kottatum.

Filmography

Actor
Films

Television

Dubbing artist

Rana Event

Rana Productions

References

External links

Indian male film actors
Tamil male actors
Living people
1977 births
People from Coimbatore
Male actors from Tamil Nadu
M.G.R. Government Film and Television Training Institute alumni